Athos Careghi (Correggio 1939), is an Italian cartoonist of emilian origin. He is an autodidact and works and lives in Milan.

Biography
He worked for newspapers in Belgium and the Netherlands and was a worker in a rubber factory and a miner in a coal mine. Back in Italy he started studying and working as a typist and eventually graduated in Economics and commerce.

He does not use words (or balloons) in his cartoons and is nicknamed "Silence".

One of his most famous characters is Fra Tino, a young, joyful, candid and speechless monk.
Now works for "IL GIORNALINO".

References

1939 births
Living people
Italian cartoonists